Colin Buchanan (born May 23, 1964) is an Australian singer, entertainer and multi-instrumentalist.

Early life
Colin moved with his family to Melbourne, Australia as a six-year-old, and then Peakhurst, Sydney, before moving to the outback in 1988, with his wife for a couple of years, studying with Cornerstone Community inc. This included a year in Bourke, in the corner country of New South Wales, and another in Grenfell, New South Wales.

Career
Colin has won nine Golden Guitar Australian Country Music Awards and has written songs with Lee Kernaghan, Adam Brand and Troy Cassar-Daley. His song "Hat Town", written with Lee Kernaghan, won an APRA Award, while his Christmas album, recorded with Greg Champion, has become an Australian classic, in particular his "Aussie Jingle Bells", now a staple at school end-of-year concerts. He was nominated for four ARIA Awards in 1993 for Best Country Album for Hard Times (lost to Lee Kernaghan for The Outback Club), in 1994 for Best Children's Album for I Want My Mummy (lost to Mic Conway for Whoopee), in 1998 for Best Country Album for Edge of the Kimberley (lost to Shanley Del for My Own Sweet Time) and in 2013 for Best Comedy Release for The TGIF Songs of Colin Buchanan (lost to Tom & Alex for The Bits We're Least Ashamed of).

Colin was a regular presenter on ABC TV's Play School from 1992 to 1999, when the program was revamped. More recently he appeared on Playhouse Disney, a co-production between Australia's Seven Network and Disney Channel. He appeared with Monica Trapaga each year representing Seven and Disney on Carols in the Domain. For 20 years he hosted Qantas' in-flight audio entertainment, predominantly "Big Country", pioneering the guest co-host format eventually adopted across all Qantas inflight audio channels.

Since the mid-1990s, Colin has devoted much of his time to producing Christian albums. In particular, his children's albums are popular across Australia, United Kingdom and in parts of the United States. A former school teacher at several schools, his songs can be heard playing in many a primary classroom and Sunday School.

Personal life
Colin and his wife, Robyn have four children named Elliot, Laura, Emily and Riley.

Discography

Studio albums

Compilation albums
Bourke To Beaconsfield (2006)
The TGIF Songs Of Colin Buchanan (Double CD) (2013)

Religious Children's albums
I Want My Mummy (1993)
Remember the Lord (1996)
Practise Being Godly (1997)
Follow the Saviour (1998)
Live in the Big Tent (2000)
Special Edition Volume # 1 (compilation of demos) (2000)
10, 9, 8... God Is Great (2002)
Baa Baa Doo Baa Baa (compilation) (2003)
Jesus Rocks the World (2004)
King of Christmas (Double CD) (2005)
Nicky Nacky Nocky Noo (2006)
Colin's Favourites (Compilation) (2007)
Super Saviour (2008)
Boom Chicka Boom (2009)
God Rock (2011)
Live in the Big Tent (Special Edition) (2010)
King of the Jungle (2013)
The Jesus Hokey Pokey (2014)
Jingle Jingle Jesus (2015)
Boss Of The Cross (2016)
Colin's Crackers Favourites Vol 2 (2016)
Living on the Rock (2016)
Colin's New Testament Big Bible Story Songs (2017)
Jesus The Game Changer (2017)
Fam Bam Bible Jam! (2018)
Catechismo Kids (2019)
Colin Buchanan's Old Testament Sing-A-Long (2020)

Singles
"Missin' Slim" (Lee Kernaghan & Colin Buchanan) (2004 tribute to the deceased Slim Dusty)
"Goodbye, Crocodile Hunter" (2006 tribute to the deceased Steve Irwin)

Awards and nominations

APRA Music Awards

ARIA Music Awards
The ARIA Music Awards are a set of annual ceremonies presented by Australian Recording Industry Association (ARIA), which recognise excellence, innovation, and achievement across all genres of the music of Australia. They commenced in 1987.

Country Music Awards of Australia
The Country Music Awards of Australia (CMAA) (also known as the Golden Guitar Awards) is an annual awards night held in January during the Tamworth Country Music Festival, celebrating recording excellence in the Australian country music industry. They have been held annually since 1973. Buchanan has won seven awards and two as a songwriter.
 (wins only)
|-
| 1992
| Colin Buchanan - "Galahs in the Gidgee"
| New Talent of the Year
| 
|-
| 1993
| "A Drover's Wife"
| Heritage Award 
| 
|-
| 1998
| "Edge of the Kimberley"
| Heritage Song of the Year 
| 
|-
|rowspan="2"| 1999
| "Tough Job" (with Lee Kernaghan)
| Vocal Collaboration of the Year
| 
|-
| "That Old Caravan"
| Bush Ballad of the Year
| 
|-
| 2000
| "They Don't Make 'em Like That Anymore"
| APRA Song of the Year
| 
|-
| 2005
| "Missin' Slim" (with Lee Kernaghan)
| Heritage Song of the Year
| 
|-
| 2007
| "Close As a Whisper (The Gift)" (performed by Lee Kernaghan - written by Lee Kernaghan, Garth Porter & Colin Buchanan)
| Heritage Song of the Year
| 
|-
| 2010
| "The Road to Thargomindah" (performed by The Bushwackers - written Colin Buchanan)
| Bush Ballad of the Year
| 
|-

Tamworth Songwriters Awards
The Tamworth Songwriters Association (TSA) is an annual songwriting contest for original country songs, awarded in January at the Tamworth Country Music Festival. They commenced in 1986. Colin Buchanan has won six awards.
 (wins only)
|-
| 1990
| "Up to Their Eyeballs" by Colin Buchanan
| Amateur Traditional Award
| 
|-
| 1991
| "Debutantes Ball" by Colin Buchanan
| Professional Traditional Award
| 
|-
| 1994
| "Dem Doggies Don't Care" by Colin Buchanan
| Children's Song of the Year 
| 
|-
| 2003
| "Jesus Is No Fairytale" by Colin Buchanan
| Children's Song of the Year 
| 
|-
| 2006
| "King of Christmas" by Colin Buchanan
| Children's Song of the Year 
| 
|-
| 2015
| Colin Buchanan
| Songmaker Award
| 
|-

References

External links
 Colin Buchanan

1964 births
Living people
APRA Award winners
Australian country singer-songwriters
Australian country singers
Australian guitarists
Australian performers of Christian music
Irish emigrants to Australia
Australian country guitarists
Australian male guitarists
Australian singer-songwriters
Australian children's television presenters
Australian Christians
Acoustic guitarists
Australian harmonica players
Australian male singer-songwriters
Australian multi-instrumentalists